is a passenger railway station located in the city of Nagahama, Shiga, Japan, operated by the West Japan Railway Company (JR West). The station is also a freight depot for the Japan Freight Railway Company (JR Freight).

Lines

Station layout
The station consists of two opposed side platforms connected by an elevated station building. The station is staffed.

Platform

Adjacent stations

History
The station opened on 10 March 1882 on the Japanese Government Railway (JGR).  The station came under the aegis of the West Japan Railway Company (JR West) on 1 April 1987 due to the privatization of Japan National Railway. 

Station numbering was introduced in March 2018 with Takatsuki being assigned station number JR-A06.

Passenger statistics
In fiscal 2019, the station was used by an average of 726 passengers daily (boarding passengers only).

Surrounding area
former Takatsuki Town Hall
Nagahama City Takatsuki Library
Nagahama City Takatsuki Junior High School
Nagahama City Takatsuki Elementary School

See also
List of railway stations in Japan

References

External links

0541406 JR West official home page

Railway stations in Shiga Prefecture
Railway stations in Japan opened in 1882
Stations of Japan Freight Railway Company
Hokuriku Main Line
Nagahama, Shiga